Glukhoy is a rural locality (a khutor) in Karshevitskoye Rural Settlement, Leninsky District, Volgograd Oblast, Russia. The population was 17 as of 2010.

Geography 
Glukhoy is located on the left bank of the Volga River, 38 km southeast of Leninsk (the district's administrative centre) by road. Karshevitoye is the nearest rural locality.

References 

Rural localities in Leninsky District, Volgograd Oblast